The Red and Charline McCombs Field is the current home of the University of Texas Longhorn Women's Softball team.

Opening in 1998 at a cost of $4.5 million, the stadium seats 1,254 and is named after university benefactor Red McCombs and his wife Charline. It features a clay infield and a grass outfield. Texas later added a 4,400-square foot training facility along the left-field line, completed in 2009.

Attendance Record

Through 2022 Season

Notes

Softball venues in Texas

Texas Longhorns sports venues
College softball venues in the United States
Sports venues completed in 1998
University of Texas at Austin campus
Texas Longhorns softball